Darren Mark Shapland (born November 1966) is a British businessman. He is the former chief executive officer of Carpetright, and he serves as the chairman of Maplin Electronics and Moo.com. He also served as the chairman of Poundland from 2014 to 2016. He is a non-executive director of Wolseley.

He is married to Wendy Sarah Shapland.

References

Living people
British chief executives
British chairpersons of corporations
British corporate directors
1966 births